Gračanica Lake is an artificial reservoirs on the river Gračanka two kilometers above Gračanica, built in 1963–1966 in order to supply city of Pristina with water. The dam height of 52 m, a width of 246 m, was built in Badovac ravine below Androvac mountains, near the mine "Rainwater".

In February 2014, water levels were threatened, due to a very dry winter.

During its construction displaced the Serbian village of Novo Selo, Gračanica, in Gaza waters of the lake, and Badovc, below the dam. With them were sunken remains of the old church of St. Archangel Church and cemetery in Novo Selo.

See also
Water in Pristina
Gračanica uskoro bez vode?

References

External links

Lakes of Kosovo